was a businessman, politician and cabinet minister in Taishō and early Shōwa period Japan. After serving as president of Osaka Shōsen Shipping Company (OSK Lines), he entered politics and later served as a cabinet minister.

Biography
Nakahashi was the son of a samurai in the service of the Maeda clan of Kaga Domain. After the Meiji Restoration, he studied at the law school of Tokyo Imperial University, specializing in his post-graduate curriculum in commercial law, and in 1886, soon after graduation, worked in Yokohama as a trial lawyer and judge in commercial cases. However, in 1887, he was scouted as a councilor for the Ministry of Agriculture and Commerce, and then asked to serve as a legal councilor for the lower house of the Diet of Japan in 1889. In this capacity, he travelled to the United States and to Korea, serving subsequently in the secretariat of the House of Representatives, councilor to the Ministry of Communications, Director of the Audit Board of the Ministry of Communications, and Director of the Railway Bureau.

In 1898, Nakahashi was asked by his father-in-law, Takana Ichibe, to assume the post of president of Osaka Shōsen Shipping Company. He was active in expanding the firms operations in Taiwan, which had just become part of the Japanese Empire following the First Sino-Japanese War. He also served on the board of directors of Chisso, one of the minor zaibatsu, and it was during his tenure that Chisso began construction of a plant in Minamata, Kumamoto.
Nakahashi’s political career began in 1901, when he was elected to the Osaka City Assembly, and served as its chairman. In the 1902 General Election, Nakahashi was elected to the House of Representatives of Japan from the Osaka general constituency and was re-elected five consecutive times. He joined the Rikken Seiyūkai in 1914. In 1918, he changed his constituency to the Kanazawa Prefectural general constituency.

Nakahashi was appointed to the cabinet of the Hara Takashi administration as Education Minister in 1918. While Education Minister, Nakahashi sought to expand the higher education system in Japan, including the creation of five more medical schools, 29 schools of pharmacy, and creating additional imperial universities. Following Hara’s assassination in 1921, Nakahashi continued as Education Minister in the cabinet of Takahashi Korekiyo. In 1924, together with Tokonami Takejirō, he joined the new Seiyu Hontō, helping bring down the Takahashi administration, but returned to the Rikken Seiyukai in 1925.

In 1927, under the cabinet of Tanaka Giichi, Nakahashi served as Minister of Commerce and Industry. On 23 May 1927, he established a Commerce and Industry Deliberation Council to examine issues with the Japanese economy, and to determine steps to take to improve the situation, compile economic statistics and to encourage economic rationalization through the mergers of companies.

In 1931, Nakahashi returned to the cabinet once more, as Home Minister under the Inukai Tsuyoshi administration, however, he was forced to resign his position in 1932 due to illness. He died in 1934 at the age of 74. His grave is at the temple of Gokoku-ji in Tokyo.

References
Frederick, Louse. Japan Encyclopedia. Belknap Press (2002). 
 Hunter, Janet.  A Concise Dictionary of Modern Japanese History . University of California Press (1994). 
 Johnson, Chalmers.  Miti and the Japanese Miracle: The Growth of Industrial Policy, 1925–1975 . Stanford University Press (1983). 
 Sims, Richard. Japanese Political History Since the Meiji Renovation 1868–2000. Palgrave Macmillan. 
Tatsuki, Mariko. First century of Mitsui O.S.K Lines, Ltd. (1985). OCoLC 656221126

Notes

 

1864 births
1948 deaths
People from Ishikawa Prefecture
Rikken Seiyūkai politicians
20th-century Japanese politicians
Government ministers of Japan
Ministers of Home Affairs of Japan
Politicians from Ishikawa Prefecture